Luigi Maggi (21 December 1867 – 22 August 1946) was an Italian actor and film director who worked prolifically during the silent era. Working for Ambrosio Film he co-directed the 1908 hit film The Last Days of Pompeii, which launched the historical epic as a popular Italian genre.

Selected filmography

Director
Gli ultimi giorni di Pompei (The Last Days of Pompeii) (1908)
Nerone (Nero) (1909)
 (1909)
Il guanto (The Glove) (1910), a rediscovered lost film
 (After Fifty Years, The Golden Wedding) (1911)
 (1914), with Paola Pezzaglia
  (1924)

References

Sources 
Moliterno, Gino. Historical Dictionary of Italian Cinema. Scarecrow Press, 2008.
Winkler, Martin M. Troy: From Homer's Iliad to Hollywood Epic. John Wiley & Sons, 2009.

External links 

1867 births
1946 deaths
Italian male film actors
Italian film directors
Actors from Turin
20th-century Italian male actors
Film people from Turin